Gijali may refer to:
Gijali-ye Bala
Gijali-ye Pain